The Eugene Public Library is a municipal public library in Eugene, Oregon, United States. It has been in four different buildings since 1898.

History
In 1898, a group of women founded the Fortnightly Club and opened a private reading room in a store building in downtown Eugene.  Eugene Public Library was established as a tax-supported entity in 1904. In 1906, Oregon's first Carnegie Library was established on the corner of Willamette Street and East 11th Avenue. In 1959, a new library building opened at the corner of West 13th Avenue and Olive Street. This remained the main library building until it was moved to its current location at West 10th Avenue and Charnelton Street in 2002. At this time, the library already had two branches—Bethel (West Eugene) and Sheldon (Cal Young neighborhood)—that had opened in 2000.

In 2003 the new library building won first place in the American Institute of Architects of Southwest Oregon's public architecture awards. The library received a $1.1 million bequest in 2009 from the estate of Frederick "Doc" Rankin, a Eugene doctor and property owner who died in 2004.

Current building
The library's latest building and its underground parking garage have been described as "energy efficient, low maintenance, and filled with daylight." The new building is four times larger than the older one.

The number of users of the library approximately tripled after the new building opened, and then further increased following the economic downturn of 2008. In addition, its collection of items has had a net increase since 2005, as well as its circulation and visits.

References

External links
Official site
"Public libraries grow to support community needs": Daily Journal of Commerce

1898 establishments in Oregon
Buildings and structures in Eugene, Oregon
Education in Eugene, Oregon
Library buildings completed in 1959
Library buildings completed in 2002
Public libraries in Oregon
Libraries established in 1898